Guro Angell Gimse  (born 20 July 1971) is a Norwegian politician.

She was elected deputy representative to the Storting for the period 2017–2021 for the Conservative Party. She replaced Linda C. Hofstad Helleland at the Storting from October 2017.

References

1971 births
Living people
Conservative Party (Norway) politicians
Members of the Storting